Transfer of energy may refer to:

Energy transformation, also known as energy conversion, is the process of changing energy from one form to another.
Heat transfer, the exchange of thermal energy via conduction, convection and radiation
Collision, an event in which two or more bodies exert forces on each other over a relatively short time
Wireless power transfer, the transmission of electrical energy from a power source to an electrical load, without the use of man-made conductors
Transfer of energy from one place to another:
Electric power transmission, the bulk movement of electrical energy from a power plant to an electrical substation
District heating, a system for distributing heat generated in a centralized location for residential and commercial space heating and water heating